Afshin Ghaffarian (born 1986 in Mashhad) is an Iranian choreographer, director, dancer, and actor, participating primarily with the group "Reformances".  Desert Dancer is  a 2014 movie inspired by his life. Ghaffarian was portrayed by Reece Ritchie.

Biography 
Ghaffarian started his art career in 1999, in Saba Art Center. He holds a high school diploma in Cinema and a Bachelor of Arts in Theatre from Islamic Azad University Central Tehran Branch.

In late 2009, he received media attention after his performance in "Strange But True", part of Iranian cultural festival in Mulheim an der Ruhr, Germany. As the play ended, he appeared with a green bracelet, a sign of Iranian Green Movement, chanting "Where is my vote?". He did not return to Iran and went to France as a refugee where he started the dance company "Reformances". He met and collaborated with Shahrokh Moshkin Ghalam in France. During 2010-2011, he attended Centre National de la Danse.

Ghaffarian is the founder of the "Reformances" company (a portmanteau of the words Reform and Performance).

In 2014, Afshin renounced  his  refugee status in France and he decided to go to Iran, a travel which put an end to his five years of exile, but he is still living in Paris.
He is currently studying political science at the Sorbonne in Paris.

Books, article and interviews
(Persian) Hervé Pons, Le corps de l'acteur ou la nécessité de trouver un autre langage: six entretiens romains avec Pippo Delbono, Translated by Afshin Ghaffarian, 2015. 
 Thomas Richards. At Work with Grotowski on Physical Actions. Translated by Afshin Ghaffarian. Ghatreh, 2011. .
 Afshin Ghaffarian, Baptiste Pizzinat. Café Des Réformances. La Compagnie des réformances, 2013. .
 Afshin Ghaffarian. "I condemned myself to exile". La revue 6mois , 2014.
 Afshin Ghaffarian. "Interview with Afshin Ghaffarian: from desert dancer to reformancer…". Reformancers.com, 2015.
 Afshin Ghaffarian. "Interview with P E O P L E F O L I O". peoplefolio.com

References

External links
Official website

Living people
Iranian male stage actors
Iranian male dancers
Iranian emigrants to France
People from Mashhad
1986 births
Islamic Azad University, Central Tehran Branch alumni